Events from the year 2011 in the United Arab Emirates.

Incumbents
President: Khalifa bin Zayed Al Nahyan 
Prime Minister: Mohammed bin Rashid Al Maktoum

Events

January
 January 9 - Hillary Clinton of the United States speaks out against Iran in Abu Dhabi during a five-day trip to the United Arab Emirates, Oman and Qatar. She requests that the world increase its pressure on Iran, a country she considers "a serious concern".
 January 31 - Oman says it has uncovered a spy network from the United Arab Emirates operating in the country.

March
 March 9 - Intellectuals in the United Arab Emirates petition the country's government for free and fair elections.
 March 20 - The United Arab Emirates sends aircraft to Sardinia, Libya to join the anti-Gaddafi effort.

April
 April 12 – British tourist Lee Bradley Brown dies in police custody of causes that are still not clear.
 April 18 - An anti-piracy conference opens in Dubai.

May
 May 15 - The New York Times reports that private military company Xe Services LLC (previously Blackwater Worldwide) is putting together an army of mercenaries in the United Arab Emirates.
 May 22 - The embassy of the United Arab Emirates is attacked in Sana'a, Yemen as it holds a meeting of Arab and Western mediators leading to an evacuation by helicopter.

July
 July 18 - The trial of five bloggers in the United Arab Emirates for advocating democratic reforms resumes.

September
 September 24 - Voters in the United Arab Emirates go to the polls for parliamentary elections.

Sports
2011 Dubai Tennis Championships

 
Years of the 21st century in the United Arab Emirates
United Arab Emirates
United Arab Emirates
2010s in the United Arab Emirates